Abit may refer to:

 Abit, Burma, village in Burma
 Abit (Armenian Bitumen), an asphalt production company in Surenavan, Armenia
 Ajay Binay Institute of Technology
 Saint-Abit, commune in France
 Universal Abit, defunct Taiwanese computer brand